José Cardoso Dutra (18 July 1937 – 6 January 2022) was a Brazilian politician. A member of the Brazilian Democratic Movement and later the Brazilian Labour Party, he served in the Legislative Assembly of Amazonas from 1971 to 1979 and again from 1983 to 1987. He then served in the Chamber of Deputies from 1987 to 1995. He died of cardiac arrest in Brasília on 6 January 2022, at the age of 84.

References

1937 births
2022 deaths
20th-century Brazilian politicians
21st-century Brazilian politicians
Brazilian Democratic Movement politicians
Brazilian Labour Party (current) politicians
Members of the Legislative Assembly of Amazonas
Members of the Chamber of Deputies (Brazil) from Amazonas
People from Amazonas (Brazilian state)